Hudson Tonga'uiha born as Kosilio Tonga'uiha (born 16 November 1983 in Tofua) is a Tongan rugby footballer. He plays for London Welsh as a centre or fullback.

Rugby league
In 2006 he represented the Tonga national rugby league team at the 2006 Pacific Cup.

Rugby union
He was a member of Tonga squad at the 2007 Rugby World Cup, but he only played at the 20–36 defeat by England.

Tonga'uiha plays previously played for the Doncaster Knights.

Notes

External links

1983 births
Living people
Doncaster R.F.C. players
Expatriate rugby union players in England
People from Haʻapai
Rugby union fullbacks
Tonga international rugby union players
Tonga national rugby league team players
Tongan expatriate rugby union players
Tongan expatriate sportspeople in England
Tongan rugby league players
Tongan rugby union players